Pachnistis fulvocapitella is a moth in the family Autostichidae. It was described by Henry Legrand in 1966. It is found on Mahé and Praslin, both in the Seychelles.

References

Moths described in 1966
Pachnistis